Bear Lake (one of a dozen lakes by this name in Alaska) is   near the town of Seward and Resurrection Bay, in the Kenai Peninsula Borough on the  Kenai Peninsula in the U.S. state of Alaska. It is accessible from Bear Creek Road, which connects it to the Seward Highway. It is the site of salmon enhancement activities since 1962. This program is now managed by the Cook Inlet Aquaculture Association.
Current projects at Bear Lake focus on increasing sockeye and coho salmon by controlling species that are predators and competitors.

The Bear Lake Formation provides scientists with important geological information about the Miocene environment.

Notes

External links

Cook Inlet Aquaculture Association - Projects: Bear Lake
Reservoir Characterization of the Bear Lake and Milky River Formations, Bristol Bay Basin, Alaska Peninsula

Lakes of Alaska
Lakes of Kenai Peninsula Borough, Alaska